The 1993 NCAA Division III football season, part of the college football season organized by the NCAA at the Division III level in the United States, began in August 1993, and concluded with the NCAA Division III Football Championship, also known as the Stagg Bowl, in December 1993 at Salem Football Stadium in Salem, Virginia. The Mount Union Purple Raiders won their first Division III championship by defeating the Rowan Profs, 34−24. The first Gagliardi Trophy was awarded to Mount Union's quarterback Jim Ballard.

Conference and program changes
Following an NCAA rule change passed in January 1991, which required Division I schools to conduct all sports at the Division I level by 1993, multiple Division I universities were forced to move their football programs from the Division III level. As such, teams from  Butler University, the University of Dayton, Drake University, the University of Evansville, Valparaiso University, the University of San Diego, Jacksonville University, Creighton University, Bradley University, Davidson College, Georgetown University, Marist College, Canisius College, Duquesne University, Fairfield University, Iona College, St. John's University, St. Peter's University, and Siena College. Many of these teams became football members of non-scholarship Division I FCS football leagues like the Pioneer Football League, the Metro Atlantic Athletic Conference, the Patriot League, and the Big South Conference.

Conference changes

Conference standings

Conference champions

Postseason
The 1993 NCAA Division III Football Championship playoffs were the 21st annual single-elimination tournament to determine the national champion of men's NCAA Division III college football. The championship Stagg Bowl game was held at Salem Football Stadium in Salem, Virginia for the third time. As of 2014, Salem has remained the yearly host of the Stagg Bowl. Like the previous eight tournaments, this year's bracket featured sixteen teams.

Playoff bracket

See also
1993 NCAA Division I-A football season
1993 NCAA Division I-AA football season
1993 NCAA Division II football season

References